Tagachí is a settlement in Quibdó Municipality, Chocó Department in Colombia.

Climate
Tagachí has an extremely wet tropical rainforest climate (Af).

References

Populated places in the Chocó Department